Maximilien August Topler (25 June 1870 – 14 March 1960) was a German physicist known for his work on electrostatics, sparks and Schlieren photography. His father was the physicist August Toepler.

Toepler's law (1906) states that the resistance of an electric arc at any time is inversely proportional to the charge which has flowed through the arc:

where I(t) is the current in the arc discharge at time t, and D is the gap between the electrodes.

References 
 Toepler's law (PDF)
 High Voltage Engineering Fundamentals
 Toepler, Annalen der Physik, 1906; 4: 191. (original publication)

1870 births
1960 deaths
20th-century German physicists